The subtribe Barypina is a group of beetles in the Broscini tribe of Carabidae (the ground beetles) and is found throughout South America.

Description 
Barypina has two genera:
 Barypus: 3 subgenera; 24 species.
 Bembidiomorphum: 1 species.

References 

Insect subtribes